Paraprisomera is a genus of phasmids belonging to the family Lonchodidae.

The species of this genus are found in Sri Lanka.

Species:

Paraprisomera coronata 
Paraprisomera taprobanae

References

Lonchodidae
Phasmatodea genera